This is a partial list of Jupiter's  trojan asteroids (60° behind Jupiter) with numbers 500001–600000 .

500001–600000 

This list contains 509 objects sorted in numerical order.

top

References 
 

 Trojan_5
Jupiter Trojans (Trojan Camp)
Lists of Jupiter trojans